{{Infobox person
| name          = Ben Delo
| image         = Ben Delo on stage at The Spectator's "Who's afraid of Bitcoin?" conference.jpg
| alt           = Delo at The Spectators "Who’s afraid of Bitcoin?” conference, October 2018
| caption       = Delo in 2018
| birth_name    = Ben Peter Delo
| birth_date    = 
| birth_place   = Sheffield, England
| death_place   = 
| occupation    = Mathematician, computer programmer, entrepreneur
| years_active  = 
| education     = Lord Williams's School
| known_for     = Co-founding BitMEX
| notable_works = 
}}Ben Delo''' (born 24 February 1984) is a British entrepreneur. He is a co-founder and former executive of BitMEX. In 2022, Delo pled guilty to United States Bank Secrecy Act violations and received a 30-month probation sentence and $10m fine.

Early life and education
Born in Sheffield, Delo was educated at Lord Williams's School and graduated from the University of Oxford in 2005 with a double first-class honours degree in Mathematics and Computer Science.

Career
Delo began his career as a software engineer at IBM, where he was named as an inventor on several patents granted by the United States Patent and Trademark Office and the Intellectual Property Office.

He then went on to develop high-frequency trading systems at hedge funds and banks such as GSA Capital and J.P. Morgan, dealing predominantly in kdb+/Q. His expertise covers the design, architecture, and implementation of quantitative infrastructure, systems, and tools.

In 2014, Delo met Arthur Hayes and Sam Reed, and they co-founded BitMEX, a cryptocurrency derivatives trading platform. In 2018 The Times in incorrectly reported that Delo had been included in the Sunday Times Rich List for that year following ruling by Independent Press Standards Organisation.

Bank Secrecy Act violations
On 1 October 2020, the Commodity Futures Trading Commission and the US Department of Justice simultaneously formally charged BitMEX and its co-founders, including Delo, with various violations of American law. Delo and three others were charged with violating the Bank Secrecy Act by failing to implement an adequate anti-money laundering program. Further, the regulators alleged that the BitMEX trading platform was required to have registered aspects of its operations in the US and had failed to do so.  

In March 2021, Delo travelled to the United States and surrendered himself to authorities in New York. He pled not guilty to the charges and was bailed on a $20m bond before being allowed to return to the United Kingdom. On 24 February 2022, the Attorney for the Southern District of New York announced that Delo and his BitMEX cofounder had pled guilty to Bank Secrecy Act violations for "willfully failing to establish, implement, and maintain an anti-money laundering ('AML') program at BitMEX". Under the terms of their plea agreements, Delo and his cofounders each agreed to pay a $10 million civil monetary penalty to the CFTC.

On 16 June 2022 Delo was sentenced to 30 months probation.

Philanthropy
In October 2018, Delo gave £5 million to his Oxford alma mater Worcester College, endowing two teaching fellowships in perpetuity and becoming the youngest major donor in the College's history. In April 2019, Delo signed The Giving Pledge, announcing his intention to give away at least half of his wealth during his lifetime being inspired by the philosophy of effective altruism. That month Delo also became a member of Giving What We Can. In March 2020, Delo along with Effective Giving'' funded a project led by the University of Oxford to survey of community-based infection of COVID-19 in the UK.

References

Giving Pledgers
21st-century philanthropists
Hong Kong businesspeople
Living people
People associated with cryptocurrency
People associated with effective altruism
People educated at Lord Williams's School
Alumni of Worcester College, Oxford
Fellows of Worcester College, Oxford
Alumni of the University of Oxford
1984 births